Malecki (feminine: Malecka; plural: Maleccy) or Małecki (feminine: Małecka; plural: Małeccy) is a surname. It is usually derived from place names such as Małki. In Poland, the surname with Ł is over ten times more frequent.

People 
Aleksander Małecki (1901–1939), Polish fencer
Dariusz Małecki (born 1975), Polish field hockey player
Edmund Malecki (1914–2001), German footballer
Hieronim Malecki (1527 – 1583 or 1584), Polish Lutheran pastor and theologian
Grzegorz Małecki (born 1967), Polish historian and diplomat
Jean Malecki, American public health official
John Malecki (born 1988), American football player
Kamil Małecki (born 1996), Polish cyclist
Maciej Małecki (born 1940), Polish composer and pianist
Mieczysław Małecki (1903–1946), Polish linguist
Patryk Małecki (born 1988), Polish footballer
Robert Malecki (born 1942), American activist
Władysław Malecki (1836–1900), Polish painter
Wojciech Małecki (born 1990), Polish footballer

Variants 
Many of the Malecki immigrants into the USA had the spelling of their names changed due to the pronunciation of the letter "C", which is pronounced as "TS" in Polish. Outside of Poland the Malecki name now has many kinds of spelling, such as Maletsky, Maleski, Malesky, and Maleshki.

References 

Polish-language surnames